Kylie Belling is an Australian stage, film and television actress and voice artist, who has also worked in other occupations.  she works as Senior Manager, First Peoples, for Creative Victoria.

Biography

Belling was born in Melbourne and is of Yorta Yorta/Wiradjuri/South Sea Islander heritage. She graduated from the University of Melbourne Victorian College of the Arts in 1985. She qualified as a secondary school teacher, later becoming a Master of Public Health. In 2017 she completed the Williamson Community Leadership Program. She has been active in Aboriginal community affairs in Victoria, working in various sectors for many statewide community and government organisations.

Belling is known for her television work. She played inmate Sarah West in Prisoner and was also an original cast member of The Flying Doctors as Sharon Herbert. Belling had an ongoing role in the series The Genie from Down Under, and in Redfern Now as Patricia.

In film, she was nominated for an AFI Award for Best Supporting Actress for The Fringe Dwellers in 1986. She is also known for her role in the 2012 movie The Sapphires as Geraldine.

Belling was also the first actress to play Ruby in the Indigenous Australian play Stolen in 1998, a role she reprised in 2000 and 2003, in several performances across Australia and internationally. She also played many other stage roles between 1985 and 2008.

She co-founded the Ilbijerri Aboriginal and Torres Strait Islander Theatre Cooperative in Melbourne in about 1991, also performing the role of artistic director.

Recognition
She has won a Deadly Award, a Koorie Women Mean Business Arts Award, and a Sydney Myer Performing Arts Indigenous Award.

Filmography

Film

Television

References

External links
 
 Kylie Belling at the Australia Council

20th-century Australian actresses
21st-century Australian actresses
Australian film actresses
Australian soap opera actresses
Australian voice actresses
Indigenous Australian actresses
Living people
1964 births